Juan Miguel "Migz" Fernandez Zubiri (born April 13, 1969) is a Filipino politician serving as the Senate President of the Philippines since July 25, 2022. Since 2016, he has been on his second stint in the Senate, first serving from 2007 to 2011. He previously served as the Senate Majority Leader from 2008 to 2010 and 2018 to 2022, and was the representative of Bukidnon's 3rd district from 1998 to 2007.

He is also the current chairman of the Philippine Eskrima Kali Arnis Foundation and the vice chairman of the Philippine Red Cross.

Zubiri resigned from the Senate in August 2011 following allegations of poll fraud during the 2007 elections and an electoral protest filed by Koko Pimentel. He continued to deny the allegations. His resignation marked a first in Senate history, as other senators who left the Senate did so in order to take up another post in public office.

Personal life
Zubiri was born in Makati, Philippines to a Negrense father of Spanish Basque heritage, Jose Maria Rubin Zubiri Jr. from Kabankalan City and a Bicolana mother, Maria Victoria Ocampo Fernandez of Libon, Albay who was raised in the province of Bukidnon in Mindanao. He speaks Cebuano, Tagalog, English, and his father's native Hiligaynon. His father Jose Maria is the incumbent Bukidnon provincial governor.

Zubiri maintains a residence in the province of Bukidnon.

On March 16, 2020, Zubiri announced that he was diagnosed with COVID-19. As of March 27, 2020, he is one of the four highest ranking Philippine Government official to have been infected with the SARS-CoV2 including Senator Angara, Senator Pimentel and AFP Chief of Staff General Santos.

Notable Positions and Affiliations
 President and Chairman, Philippine Eskrima Kali Arnis Federation 
 Governor of the Philippine Red Cross 
 Member, Rotary Club of Makati
 Governor, Ranchers' Club Philippines 1989– University of the Philippines Los Banos chapter 
 Chairman, Amateur Boxing Association of the Philippines Bukidnon Chapter 
 Chairman, Paglaum Foundation 
 Member, Upsilon Phi Sigma Fraternity and Sorority 
 President of the KATALA Foundation 
 President of the Philippine Deer Foundation

Education and athletics
Zubiri finished elementary and high school in Colegio San Agustin-Makati. He graduated from the University of the Philippines Los Baños with a degree in Bachelor of Science in Agribusiness Management. He also earned a Master of Environment and Natural Resources Management degree from the University of the Philippines Open University.

Zubiri began training for Arnis, a martial art and the national sport of the Philippines, at the age of sixteen. He won the Arnis World Championship title in 1989, defeating Jeff Finder of the United States.

In 2018, he was conferred with an Honorary Fellowship by the Royal Institution of Singapore, an unaccredited institution.

Political career

Congress
After serving as chief of staff of his father, Rep. Jose Maria Zubiri, Jr., from 1995 to 1998, he ran for the seat representing the third district of Bukidnon to be vacated by his father in the 1998 elections. Winning easily in that election, he served his first term in the 10th Congress. During his first term, he was one of the members of what the media dubbed as the "Spice Boys", a group of neophyte and two-term congressmen who were openly critical of President Joseph Estrada's administration. He was subsequently re-elected to the Philippine House of Representatives in the 2001 and 2004 elections.

Senate
After serving as a congressman for three terms, he was drafted by Lakas CMD to be one of their candidates in the pro-Gloria Macapagal Arroyo administration TEAM Unity ticket for the 2007 mid-term elections.

In the final tally for the 2007 senatorial race by the Philippine Commission on Elections (Comelec), Rep. Zubiri narrowly defeated opposition candidate Koko Pimentel for the 12th and last slot in the Senate. Zubiri had a total of 11,001,730 votes against Pimentel's 10,983,358 votes. The margin of some 18,372 votes was strongly contested, particularly the votes from the southern Philippine province of Maguindanao, where Pimentel had lost to Zubiri by a landslide.

Claiming that the votes in Maguindanao were tainted, Pimentel petitioned the Philippine Supreme Court to invalidate the votes from Maguindanao, effectively disenfranchising a whole province. The Supreme Court voted unanimously 14 -0 against Pimentel and allowed the COMELEC (Commission on Elections) to count the votes in Zubiri's favor. Pimentel then returned to the Supreme Court for a second time. This time, he petitioned the justices to issue a restraining order against the proclamation of Zubiri. After oral arguments, however, the High Tribunal again voted to uphold the COMELEC's decision to proclaim Zubiri, consequently failing to grant Pimentel's petition. The next day, July 14, 2007, Zubiri was duly proclaimed elected to the Philippine Senate. However, the Court's judgment did not prevent Pimentel from bringing his poll protests to the Senate Electoral Tribunal.

On March 14, 2008, the Supreme Court, in a 40-page decision penned by Associate Justice Minita Chico-Nazario, dismissed Koko Pimentel petition to stop the Commission on Elections from canvassing votes from the province of Maguindanao, a definite morale booster for Senator Zubiri.

While serving his stint in the Senate, Zubiri began advocating a more in-depth study of biofuels in order to prevent food shortages, all the while allowing current production of alternative clean energy and biofuels so as to lessen dependence on imported oil and allow the Philippine economy a new avenue of economic success, "especially in this day and age of constant rising oil prices". In the 14th Congress of the Philippine Senate, he became Senate Majority Leader, replacing Senator Francis Pangilinan on November 17, 2008. During his Majority Leadership, the Senate passed a record 650 bills.

On August 3, 2011, however, during his privilege speech on the floor in the Philippine Senate, Zubiri suddenly announced his resignation from the body. In his speech, he said that his family was hurt by the "unfounded" accusations against him. "Without admitting any fault and with my vehement denial of the alleged electoral fraud hurled against me, I am submitting my resignation as a duly elected Senator of the Republic of the Philippines in the election for which I am falsely accused without mercy and compassion," Zubiri said in his speech. "My political detractors began calling me ugly names and dragging the name of my family in entirety. In other words, Mr. President, the trial by publicity has begun," he continued.

His resignation was lauded by Malacañang and various sectors, but was also seen as a step that helped restore the Filipino's faith in national electoral protests. Senator Francis Pangilinan, a member of the Senate Electoral Tribunal, likewise refused to comment on what the next procedure is for the vacancy left by Zubiri. "Let's just wait for developments if any," he said.

In 2013, Zubiri ran for the Senate under the opposition United Nationalist Alliance ticket but lost, placing 14th out of the 12 seats with 11,821,134 votes.

In 2016, he ran again for the Senate as an independent candidate. Zubiri was adopted by various political parties who considered his popularity among voters of various age and social groups. With 16 million votes, he placed sixth in the polls, making him successful this time.

In the 17th Congress, he was once again elected as Senate Majority Leader on May 21, 2018, succeeding Tito Sotto, who was elected Senate President.

In 2022, Zubiri successfully defended his seat. Running as an independent candidate with the support of both the UniTeam Alliance (which supported Bongbong Marcos in the concurrent presidential election) and the MP3 Coalition, which supported Manny Pacquiao for President, he received nearly 19 million votes, finishing eighth out of twelve successful candidates.

In late May 2022, he announced his candidacy for the position of President of the Senate, to succeed Tito Sotto, who is retiring. On June 1, Cynthia Villar, who was considered his main rival, withdrew from the race and endorsed him for the ballot scheduled to be held in late July. On the same day, he was elected President pro tempore, the second most senior position in the Senate, to fill out the remaining few weeks of the term of Ralph Recto, who had vacated the post to take up a seat in the House of Representatives. On July 25, 2022, Zubiri, being the only nominee for the post, was elected as Senate President.

Laws

Among the laws Zubiri has sponsored, authored, or co-authored across his time in both houses of Congress are:
 RA 11054 – Bangsamoro Organic Law;
 RA 9153 – Renewable Energy Act of 2008;
 RA 9367 – Biofuels Act of 2006;
 RA 10068 – Organic Agriculture Act of 2010;
 RA 9147 – Wildlife Conservation and Protection Act;
 RA 10121 – Philippine Disaster Risk Management Act;
 RA 9165 – Comprehensive Dangerous Drugs Act of 2002;
 RA 9679 – the Home Development Mutual Fund Law of 2009 (Pag-IBIG Fund);
 RA 9653 – the Rent Control Act of 2009;
 RA 9997 – the National Commission on Muslim Filipinos Act of 2009;
 RA 9996 – the Mindanao Development Authority Act of 2010;
 RA 9904 – the Magna Carta for Homeowners and Homeowners’ Associations;
 RA 9903 – Condonation of Penalties on Delinquent Social Security Contributions;
 RA 9507 – the Socialized and Low-Cost Housing Loan Condonation Program;
 RA 9850 – Declaring Arnis as the National Martial Art and Sport;
 RA 9500 – UP Charter Amendments;
 RA 9163 – National Service Training Program;
 RA 9166 – Armed Forces of the Philippines Rate Pay Base Increase Act;
 RA 10072 – the New Charter of the Philippine Red Cross;
 RA 9645 – Declaring July 27 of Every Year as Araw ng Iglesia Ni Cristo and as Special Working Holiday;
 RA 9849 – Declaring EidulAdha as a National Holiday;
 RA 10962 – Gift Check Act of 2017; and
 RA 11032 – Ease of Doing Business and Efficient Government Service Delivery Act

Ancestry

References

External links
 Juan Miguel "Migz" F. Zubiri's Official Website
 Senator Juan Miguel F. Zubiri – Senate of the Philippines

Filipino Roman Catholics
1969 births
University of the Philippines Los Baños alumni
Living people
Visayan people
Bicolano politicians
Filipino people of Spanish descent
People from Bacolod
People from Bukidnon
Independent politicians in the Philippines
Lakas–CMD politicians
Majority leaders of the Senate of the Philippines
Members of the House of Representatives of the Philippines from Bukidnon
Presidents of the Senate of the Philippines
Presidents pro tempore of the Senate of the Philippines
Pwersa ng Masang Pilipino politicians
Senators of the 18th Congress of the Philippines
Senators of the 17th Congress of the Philippines
Senators of the 14th Congress of the Philippines
United Nationalist Alliance politicians
University of the Philippines Open University alumni
Filipino people of Basque descent
Filipino martial artists
Senators of the 19th Congress of the Philippines